Jennifer Murnane O'Connor (born 24 May 1966) is an Irish Fianna Fáil politician who has been a Teachta Dála (TD) for the Carlow–Kilkenny constituency since the 2020 general election. She previously served as a Senator for the Labour Panel from 2016 from 2020.

Political career
Murnane O'Connor first ran for the Dáil in 2011, when she polled 6% of the first preference vote in Carlow–Kilkenny for Fianna Fáil.

She did not run in the 2015 by-election in the constituency, caused by the appointment of Phil Hogan to the European Commission, but was chosen to contest the 2016 general election as the Carlow-based candidate on a Fianna Fáil ticket that also featured sitting TDs John McGuinness and Bobby Aylward (who won the 2015 by-election). Murnane O'Connor polled 12% of the first preference vote but was not elected. Murnane O'Connor received 8,373 votes, which was the highest number of votes for a non-elected candidate at that election.

She was subsequently elected as a Senator for the Labour Panel in the 25th Seanad in April 2016, having narrowly missed out on a Dáil seat in the 2016 general election. She was the Fianna Fáil Seanad Spokesperson on Housing, Planning and Local Government from 2016 to 2020.

At the general election in February 2020, she was elected as a Fianna Fáil TD for the Carlow–Kilkenny constituency.

Personal life
Murnane O'Connor was born in Waterford in 1966, but is a native of Graiguecullen, County Carlow. She is the daughter of former Carlow County Councillor Jimmy Murnane, who served on the local council for several years. She was co-opted to Carlow Urban District Council in 1999, following her father's retirement. She topped the polls for both for the Urban and County Council at the following elections.

Prior to her election as a TD, she worked in Graham's; a shoe shop in Carlow.

She married Pat O'Connor in 1985. They have two sons and two daughters.

References

External links
Jennifer Murnane O'Connor's page on the Fianna Fáil website

1966 births
Living people
Fianna Fáil senators
Fianna Fáil TDs
Members of the 25th Seanad
21st-century women members of Seanad Éireann
People from County Carlow
Alumni of Cork Institute of Technology
Local councillors in County Carlow
Members of the 33rd Dáil
21st-century women Teachtaí Dála